Lionel Faure (born 26 November 1977 in France) is a rugby union player for Clermont Auvergne in the Top 14. Faure plays as a Loosehead prop, and previously played for the Sale Sharks and won the 2005–06 Guinness Premiership with them, starting in the final.

He was called up to the France squad for the 2008 Six Nations and played in the 2009 Six Nations. Altogether he has played in five matches in the tournament.

References

External links
 Clermont Auvergne profile
 France profile
Sale Sharks profile
RBS 6 Nations profile
Faure heading back home
Sale move for French prop Faure

French rugby union players
1977 births
Living people
France international rugby union players
Sale Sharks players
Rugby union props
People from Montauban
Sportspeople from Tarn-et-Garonne
ASM Clermont Auvergne players
Stade Rochelais players
Section Paloise players
French expatriate sportspeople in England
Expatriate rugby union players in England
French expatriate rugby union players